Guy Lushington Prendergast (3 August 1806 – 5 November 1887) was an English cricketer with amateur status who was associated with Cambridge University. He was recorded in one first-class match in 1826, totalling 0 runs with a highest score of 0 and holding one catch.

He was a son of Guy Lenox Prendergast of the Bombay Civil Service (later MP for Lymington 1826–27). He was educated at Harrow School and Trinity College, Cambridge, but is not recorded to have taken a degree.

In 1869, he published A Complete Concordance to the Iliad of Homer.

He is buried at Kensal Green Cemetery.

References

1806 births
1887 deaths
People educated at Harrow School
Alumni of Trinity College, Cambridge
Cambridge University cricketers
English cricketers
English cricketers of 1826 to 1863
Burials at Kensal Green Cemetery